FEZ family zinc finger 1 is a protein that in humans is encoded by the FEZF1 gene.

Clinical significance 
FEZF1 is a gene that encodes for transcriptional repressors, and it has been shown to repress the transcription factor HES5. In the mouse, FEZF1 is expressed in the forebrain in early development of the embryo. This suppression of HES5 helps to control the differentiation of neural stem cells. FEZF1 also helps to divide the caudal forebrain into three distinct parts during development: the prethalamus, the thalamus, and the pretectum.  Mice lacking FEZF1 had no prethalamus and had a smaller thalamus. A loss of function mutation in FEZF1 causes Kallmann Syndrome. As axons are developing and migrating in the early embryo, FEZF1 allows the axons of olfactory neurons to attach to the central nervous system in the mice model. During neural development, GnRH neurons migrate through one of these olfactory axon pathways, and the loss of function of FEZF1 therefore results in the loss of GnRH neurons in the brain, the hallmark of Kallmann Syndrome.

References

Further reading